The following lists events that happened during 1985 in the Grand Duchy of Luxembourg.

Incumbents

Events

January – March
 4 January – Luxembourger Gaston Thorn's term as President of the European Commission comes to an end.
 1 March – SES is established as Europe's first commercial satellite operator.

April – June
 5 April – A fire erupts at Notre-Dame Cathedral, in Luxembourg City, destroying the belfry and damaging the roof of the nave.
 24 April – Representing Luxembourg, Ireen Sheer, Margo, Franck Olivier, Chris & Malcolm Roberts, and Diane Solomon finish thirteenth in the Eurovision Song Contest 1985 with the song Children, Kinder, Enfants.
 15 May – Pope John Paul II arrives in Luxembourg for a two-day visit.
 1 June – Paul Philipp is appointed head coach of the Luxembourg national football team.
 14 June – The Schengen Agreement is signed at Schengen, in south-eastern Luxembourg, with the intention of removing border controls between signatory states.

July – September
 1 July - Luxembourg assumes the rotating Presidency of the Council of the European Union for the following six months.

October – December
 17 October – Reconstruction work is completed on Notre-Dame Cathedral, after fire damaged the cathedral on 5 April.

Births
 16 June – Andy Schleck, cyclist

Deaths
 24 April – François Neuens, cyclist
 9 July – Charlotte, Grand Duchess of Luxembourg
 8 November – Nicolas Frantz, cyclist

Footnotes

References